The Marsh King's Daughter is an upcoming psychological thriller film directed by Neil Burger and written by Mark L. Smith and Elle Smith, based on the 2017 novel of the same name by Karen Dionne. It stars Daisy Ridley, Ben Mendelsohn and Garrett Hedlund.

Premise
A woman tells her story about her life when she was young and about her mother who was abducted by her father and is forced to confront her past after he escapes from prison.

Cast
Daisy Ridley as Helena Pelletier
Brooklynn Prince as Young Helena
Ben Mendelsohn as Jacob Holbrook
Garrett Hedlund as Stephen Pelletier
Caren Pistorius as Helena's mother
 Joey Carson as Marigold Pelletier

Gil Birmingham has been cast in an undisclosed role.

Production
The project was announced in February 2018, with Elle Smith and Mark L. Smith writing the screenplay for director Morten Tyldum. Alicia Vikander was cast in the lead role, and was also set to serve as an executive producer.

Filming was due to begin in late July 2019, and continue through autumn, but no further developments were announced until February 2021, with Tyldum and Vikander no longer involved in the film. Neil Burger was now directing with Daisy Ridley cast to star, replacing Tyldum and Vikander. 
In May, Ben Mendelsohn joined the cast. In June 2021, Brooklynn Prince, Gil Birmingham, Caren Pistorius, and Garrett Hedlund joined the cast of the film.

Filming began on June 7, 2021, in Ontario, Canada. Filming officially wrapped on August 6, 2021.

Music
In April 2022, it was revealed that Adam Janota Bzowski composed the score for the film.

Release
Initially meant to be released  by STX Films, the film's distribution is currently being shopped to different distributors and alternatives is being considered at this point. Amazon Studios has acquired the European distribution rights to the film as part of ErosSTX's multi-year output deal with the company, and will release the film through Prime Video.

References

External links

Upcoming films
2023 films
American psychological thriller films
Anonymous Content films
Black Bear Pictures films
Films about prison escapes
Films based on American thriller novels
Films directed by Neil Burger
Films shot in Ontario
STX Entertainment films
Upcoming English-language films